Qeqertalik is a municipality of Greenland created in 2018 from four southern regions of the former Qaasuitsup Municipality. It is the least populated municipality at a population of 6,340, despite this it is the 2nd most densely populated municipality with 0.11 people per square kilometer

Geography 
Qeqertalik Municipality is flanked in the south by the Qeqqata municipality and in the northeast by Avannaata. Over the ice cap, it is bordered in the east by the Sermersooq municipality, however this border runs north–south (45° West meridian) through the center of the Greenland ice sheet, and as such is free of traffic.

Communities of Qeqertalik encircle Disko Bay, an inlet of the larger Baffin Bay, while the northeastern shores and Nuussuaq Peninsula belong to the neighboring municipality of Avannaata.

Politics
Qeqertalik's municipal council consists of 15 members, elected every four years.

Municipal council

Administrative divisions

Aasiaat area
 Aasiaat (Egedesminde)
 Akunnaaq
 Kitsissuarsuit (Hunde Ejlande, Dog's Island)

Kangaatsiaq area
 Kangaatsiaq
 Attu
 Iginniarfik
 Ikerasaarsuk
 Niaqornaarsuk

Qasigiannguit area
 Qasigiannguit (Christianshåb)
 Ikamiut

Qeqertarsuaq area
 Qeqertarsuaq (Godhavn)
 Kangerluk

Language 

Kalaallisut, the West Greenlandic dialect, is spoken in Kommune Qeqertalik along with Danish.

See also 
 KANUKOKA

References and notes 

 
Disko Bay
Municipalities of Greenland
States and territories established in 2018
2018 establishments in Denmark